The 2006 Big 12 Conference softball tournament was held at ASA Hall of Fame Stadium in Oklahoma City, OK from May 10 through May 13, 2006. Kansas won their first conference tournament and earned the Big 12 Conference's automatic bid to the 2006 NCAA Division I softball tournament. 

Texas would go on to play in the 2006 Women's College World Series.

Standings
Source:

Schedule
Source:

All-Tournament Team
Source:

References

Big 12 Conference softball tournament
Tournament
Big 12 softball tournament